Daniel Giménez (born 19 February 1977) is an Argentine former professional footballer who played as a forward.

External links
 
 

1977 births
Living people
People from Moreno Partido
Sportspeople from Buenos Aires Province
Argentine footballers
Association football forwards
Godoy Cruz Antonio Tomba footballers
Club Atlético Los Andes footballers
Instituto footballers
Chacarita Juniors footballers
Independiente Rivadavia footballers
Atlético de Rafaela footballers
C.D. Jorge Wilstermann players
Cobreloa footballers
Argentine expatriate footballers
Argentine expatriate sportspeople in Chile
Expatriate footballers in Chile
Argentine expatriate sportspeople in Bolivia
Expatriate footballers in Bolivia